Paul Fitzgerald  is an Irish Gaelic football player who played at inter-county level for Tipperary, and plays his club football for Fethard in south County Tipperary.

Honours

Fethard
Tipperary Senior Football Championship:
Winner (2): 1997, 2001

Tipperary
McGrath Cup:
Winner (1): 2003
Tommy Murphy Cup:
Winner (1): 2005
National Football League Division 3, title:
Winner (1): 2009
Munster Minor Football Championship:
Winner (1): 1995
South Tipperary Footballer of the Year:
Winner (1): 2008

References

External links
 Tipperary GAA Player Profile
 Tipperary Player Profiles

Living people
Fethard Gaelic footballers
Gaelic football goalkeepers
Tipperary inter-county Gaelic footballers
Year of birth missing (living people)